Scandinavian Leather is an album by the Norwegian band Turbonegro that followed the band's reunion in 2002 and was released in April 2003 on Burning Heart Records in Sweden, on Bitzcore Records in Germany, on JVC/Victor Records in Japan, and on 6 May 2003 on Epitaph Records in the United States.

Music and lyrics
With Scandinavian Leather Turbonegro returned to a more rock style, continuing that found on Apocalypse Dudes with a development of the 'deathpunk' sound. While the songwriting is reminiscent of that of the Ramones, the sound is more multi-layered, including string arrangements, harmonic backing vocals, arena rock influences and psychedelic undertones, which the band coined "Rainbow Rock", or deathpunk with a pop sensibility.

Track listing
All songs by Turbonegro.
 "The Blizzard of Flames" – 1:57 (intro)
 "Wipe It 'Til It Bleeds" – 3:43
 "Gimme Some" – 3:11
 "Turbonegro Must Be Destroyed" – 3:10
 "Sell Your Body (to the Night)" – 4:29
 "Remain Untamed" – 4:16
 "Train of Flesh" – 3:46 (contains a prelude to "Fuck the World (F.T.W.)" consisting of a reprise of "The Blizzard of Flames" at the end)
 "Fuck the World (F.T.W.)" – 4:12
 "Locked Down" – 3:21
 "I Want Everything" – 2:51
 "Drenched in Blood (D.I.B.)" – 3:58 (contains a prelude to "Le Saboteur" at the end)
 "Le Saboteur" – 2:56
 "Ride with Us" – 4:34

Personnel
Hank von Helvete (Hans Erik Dyvik Husby) – vocals
Euroboy (Knut Schreiner) – lead guitar
Rune Rebellion (Rune Grønn) – rhythm guitar
Pål Pot Pamparius (Pål Bottger Kjærnes) – keyboards, saxophone and percussion
Happy-Tom (Thomas Seltzer) – bass
Chris Summers (Christer Engen) – drums

Additional musicians
Krisvaag – drums on "The Blizzard of Flames" arranged and performed with Chris Summers
Ivar Winther – flute on "Wipe It 'Til It Bleeds"
Lars Horntvedt – string arrangements with Euroboy
Mariann Thomassen – additional backing vocals on "Train of Flesh"
Tomas Dahl – additional backing vocals on "Drenched in Blood (D.I.B.)"
Torgny Amdam – additional backing vocals on "Ride with Us"
Cops on "The Blizzard of Flames" by Odd the God and Happy-Tom.

Production
Joe Barresi – mixing
Stefan Boman – engineer
Sebastian Ludvigsen – photography
Anders Møller – engineer
Marius Bodin Larsen – engineer
Henke Jonsson – mastering
Knut Schreiner – producer
Turbonegro – producer
Klaus Voormann – cover art

References

Turbonegro albums
2003 albums
Burning Heart Records albums
Albums with cover art by Klaus Voormann